Aaron Hill may refer to:

 Aaron Hill (writer) (1685–1750), English dramatist and writer
 Aaron Hill (baseball) (born 1982), American player in Major League Baseball
 Aaron Hill (actor) (born 1983), American actor
 Aaron Hill (Luann), comic strip character
 Aaron Hill (snooker player) (born 2002), Irish snooker player

See also 
 Aaron Hill House, historic house in Cambridge, Massachusetts
 Erin Hill, American harpist, singer, and actress